This is a list of places in Singapore based on the planning areas and their constituent subzones as designated by the Urban Redevelopment Authority (URA). Both the planning areas and subzones are listed according to alphabetical order.

Central Region
The Central Region of Singapore is made up of 22 planning areas, of which 10 forms the Central Area. Planning areas that are part of the Central Area are italicised.

East Region
The East Region of Singapore consists of 6 planning areas. Tampines serves as the regional centre of the East Region.

North Region
The North Region of Singapore is made up of 8 planning areas. Its regional centre is located at Woodlands.

North-East Region
The North-East Region of Singapore is made up of 7 planning areas. There are plans to transform Seletar into the regional centre of the North-East Region in the future.

West Region
The West Region of Singapore consists of 12 planning areas. The regional centre of the West Region is Jurong East.

See also
Administrative divisions of Singapore

References

Further reading
 Perono Cacciafoco, Francesco, and Shu Qi Tuang. 2018. "Voices from the Streets: Trends in Naming Practices of Singapore Odonymy". Review of Historical Geography and Toponomastics, XIII, 25-26. pp. 9-30. 

 
Places